Emmanuel Nana Appiah Boateng known by his stage name Kontihene is a Ghanaian hiplife musician. 'Aketesea' from his debut album Nyankonton won the Song of the Year Award during the 2003 edition of the Vodafone Ghana Music Awards making him the first new artist at the time to have received this award.

Early life 
He grew up in the city of Kumasi in the Ashanti Region of Ghana. He had his basic education at the Martyrs of Uganda School and went on to Opoku Ware Secondary School. He learnt to play the piano at a young age and can play the saxophone as well.

Awards

Vodafone Ghana Music Awards 

|-
|rowspan="2"|2003
|Aketesea
|Song of the Year
|
|-
|Himself
|New Artist of the Year
|

References 

Living people
21st-century Ghanaian male singers
21st-century Ghanaian singers
Year of birth missing (living people)
Alumni of Opoku Ware School